Mamusi is an Austronesian language of East New Britain Province in Papua New Guinea.

References

Languages of East New Britain Province
Mengen languages